Infranord is a wholly owned Swedish Government enterprise and a railway contractor, providing engineering services to build and maintain railways. The company is the result of a spin-off when the Swedish Transport Administration was established in 2010, following the merger between the Swedish Rail Administration and  the Swedish Road Administration. Today, the company has a presence in all Scandinavian countries, with operations in Sweden and Norway.

The company had 2,500 employees and a turnover of over SEK 4,400 million in 2012, and its head-office is located in Solna.

See also
 Svevia
 Government-owned corporation
 List of government enterprises of Sweden

References

External links
Infranord - Official website (English)

Government-owned companies of Sweden
Construction and civil engineering companies of Sweden
Swedish companies established in 2010
Construction and civil engineering companies established in 2010
Companies based in Solna Municipality